Palo colorado is a common name for several plants and may refer to:

Luma apiculata, native to Chile
Ternstroemia luquillensis, native to Puerto Rico